Robert Knox Sneden (1832–1918) was an American landscape painter and a map-maker for the Union Army during the American Civil War. He was a prolific illustrator and memoirist documenting the war and other events.

Early life 
Robert Knox Sneden was born in Annapolis Royal, Nova Scotia, Canada and moved to New York City in 1851 at age 19. He received some architectural education.

Civil War 
Sneden left Brooklyn in 1861 to enlist in the 40th New York Volunteer Infantry Regiment, or the Mozart Regiment, of the Army of the Potomac. He served as a quartermaster when his regiment camped near Leesburg Turnpike. Starting from January 12, 1862, Sneden served on Samuel P. Heintzelman's III Corps staff, at first, as a draughtsman on map work, later, as a topographical engineer. On March 22, 1862, Sneden embarked with Heintzelman for the Peninsula Campaign, participating in the Battle of Williamsburg, Battle of Seven Pines, Battle of Savage's Station, and Battle of Glendale. Returning to Northern Virginia, he took part in the Second Battle of Bull Run. He was assigned to the defenses of Washington, D.C., first in Alexandria, Virginia, then at Arlington House.

In October, 1863, after the Battle of Bristoe Station, he was assigned to David B. Birney's division, participating in the Battle of Kelly's Ford.

He was assigned to the staff of general William H. French, during the abortive Battle of Mine Run.

Prisoner-of-War 
On November 27, 1863, Sneden was captured by Confederate rangers under John S. Mosby and became a prisoner of war for the next thirteen months. In November 1863, he was held at a tobacco warehouse next to Libby Prison, where he suffered from typhoid fever. On February 22, 1864, after a prison escape, prisoners were shipped to a new camp in Georgia. Sneden was placed in the notorious Andersonville Prison, but continued making clandestine drawings. Altogether, he sketched scenes of prison life in Savannah and Millen, Georgia, and in Florence and Charleston, South Carolina. On December 11, 1864, he was exchanged at Charleston.

Later life 
After the Civil war, although crippled from his time in Andersonville, Sneden returned to Brooklyn, where he was already declared dead or missing. He made a number of his war sketches into watercolors, leaving a legacy of close to 1000 watercolors, drawings, sketches, maps, and diagrams. Sneden contributed some of them to the Battles and Leaders of the Civil War, a series of articles published between 1884 and 1887 in The Century Magazine and then reissued as a four-volume set of books.

Sneden never married and devoted the rest of his life to preserving the Civil war memory. In 1918, Sneden died in New York State Soldiers' and Sailors' Home.

Recognition 
In 1994, an art dealer approached the Virginia Historical Society about a Civil War archive that had languished in a Connecticut bank vault. Robert Sneden's great-great-nephew also transferred through purchase Sneden's diary and watercolors, close to 5,000 pages of the diary entries and memoirs, and near 500 watercolors and maps.

In the fall of 2000, Sneden was rediscovered by the general public and the Civil war enthusiasts after about 300 pieces of his artwork were revealed in the Eye of the Storm exhibition and subsequent book, which became a bestseller. According to the Virginia Historical Society, it was, "the largest collection of [American] Civil War soldier art ever produced". Documentary-style images created by Sneden are considered as important historical records.

His works are currently held by the Virginia Historical Society, and also are available through the Library of Congress.

See also 

 Edwin Forbes
 Alfred Waud

References

Further reading 
 
 Robert Knox Sneden's Diary, Volumes 1-7, Virginia Historical Society

External links 

 The Sneden Civil War Collection online exhibition, Virginia Historical Society
 Works by Robert Knox Sneden available online via the Library of Congress 
 

1832 births
1918 deaths
People of New York (state) in the American Civil War
Military cartography
Artists from New York (state)
Union Army officers
19th-century war artists
Canadian people of the American Civil War